"I'll Smile, Even if it Hurts" is a song recorded by South Korean girl group Ladies' Code. It is the group's first release following the deaths of members EunB and RiSe in September 2014.

History
On September 1, 2014, Ladies' Code announced that they were preparing for a comeback. Two days later, however, the group was involved in a traffic collision that killed members EunB and RiSe. Almost a year later, Ladies' Code held a memorial concert in RiSe's home town of Tokyo, where they performed "I'll Smile,
Even if it Hurts," for the first time. On the anniversary of RiSe's death, the song was released as a digital single.

Reception
During the week of its release, the song charted #18 on the Gaon Music Chart.

Track listing 
 The song was written by group member Sojung.

References

Korean-language songs
2015 songs
Ladies' Code songs
Songs inspired by deaths